Alper Kasapoğlu (born 8 January 1966) is a Turkish athlete. He competed in the men's decathlon at the 1992 Summer Olympics and the 1996 Summer Olympics.

References

1966 births
Living people
Athletes (track and field) at the 1992 Summer Olympics
Athletes (track and field) at the 1996 Summer Olympics
Turkish decathletes
Olympic athletes of Turkey
People from Razgrad
Bulgarian Turks in Turkey
Mediterranean Games silver medalists for Turkey
Mediterranean Games medalists in athletics
Athletes (track and field) at the 1991 Mediterranean Games